Umar Siddiq (born 30 December 1992) is a Pakistani cricketer who plays for United Bank Limited. In March 2019, he was named in Sindh's squad for the 2019 Pakistan Cup. In September 2019, he was named in Southern Punjab's squad for the 2019–20 Quaid-e-Azam Trophy tournament.

References

External links
 

1992 births
Living people
Pakistani cricketers
Lahore Whites cricketers
United Bank Limited cricketers
Cricketers from Lahore
Islamabad United cricketers
Multan Sultans cricketers
Southern Punjab (Pakistan) cricketers